This is a list  of organists at  Worcester Cathedral, in  the city  of Worcester, England. Notable organists at Worcester have included Thomas Tomkins (from 1596), Hugh Blair (from 1895), Ivor Atkins (from 1897), David Willcocks (from 1950) and Christopher Robinson (from 1963). The present organist (from 2019) is Samuel Hudson.

Organists

 1240 Thomas the Organist*
 1415 T. Hulet*
 1468 Richard Grene
 1484 John Hampton
 1522 Daniel Boyse
 1541 Richard Fisher
 1569 John Golden
 1581 Nathaniel Giles
 1585 Robert Cotterell
 1590 Nathaniel Patrick
 1595 John Fido
 1596 Thomas Tomkins
 1649 Vacant
 1661 Giles Tomkins
 1662 Richard Browne
 1664 Richard Davis 
 1686 Vaughan Richardson
 1688 Richard Cherington
 1724 John Hoddinott
 1731 William Hayes
 1734 John Merifield
 1747 Elias Isaac
 1793 Thomas Pitt
 1806 Jeremiah Clark
 1807 William Kenge
 1813 Charles E. J. Clarke
 1844 William Done
 1895 Hugh Blair
 1897 Ivor Atkins
 1950 David Willcocks
 1957 Douglas Guest
 1963 Christopher Robinson
 1974 Donald Hunt
 1996 Adrian Lucas
 2012 Peter Nardone
 2018 James Lancelot (Interim Organist)
 2019 Samuel Hudson

1710–1745, the post of Master of the Choristers was separated from that of Organist, Ralph Dean (1710–23) and William Davis (1723–45) serving as Master of the Choristers.

Source for dates 1662–1897:

Assistant Organists
William Done 1835–1844 (afterwards organist)
Alfred James Caldicott c.1860
Robert Taylor 1865
Mr. Garton 1879
James Henry Caseley (later organist of Holy Trinity Church, Stratford-upon-Avon)
Hugh Blair Assistant Organist 1887–1889, Organist-in-Charge 1889–1895 (afterwards organist)
Henry Holloway 1889–1893
George Street Chignell 1893–1896
Frank Alfred Charles Mason 1895–1899
Edgar Thomas Cook 1904–1909
Alexander E. Brent Smith ?–1912
Edgar F.Day 1912-1962
Christopher Robinson 1962–1963 (later organist of St. George’s Chapel, Windsor Castle)
Harry Bramma 1963–1976 (later organist of Southwark Cathedral)
Paul Trepte 1976–1981 (later organist of Ely Cathedral)
Adrian Partington 1981–1991 (later organist of Gloucester Cathedral)
Raymond Johnston 1991–1998 (later organist of St Mark's Cathedral, Minneapolis, US)
Daniel Phillips 1998–2004
Christopher Allsop 2004 – 2012

Assistant Organists and Assistant Directors of Music
Christopher Allsop 2012 - August 2018 (later Assistant Director of Music, King's School, Worcester)
Nicholas Freestone September 2018 -

Sub-Assistant Organists
Simon Bertram 2007 - 2008
George Castle 2008 - 2012
James Luxton 2012 - 2014
Justin Miller 2014 - 2016
Richard Cook 2017 - 2019 (later Assistant organist of St Edmundsbury Cathedral)
Ed Jones 2019 - 2021

Explanatory notes

References

Worcester Cathedral
Worcester Cathedral
Organist